Celtis tetrandra, called the Nilgiri elm, is a species of flowering plant in the hackberry genus Celtis, family Cannabaceae. It is widely distributed across the Indian Subcontinent, southern China, Southeast Asia, and western Indonesia. It is occasionally available commercially.

References

tetrandra
Flora of the Indian subcontinent
Flora of Indo-China
Flora of Tibet
Flora of South-Central China
Flora of Southeast China
Flora of Hainan
Flora of Taiwan
Flora of Sumatra
Flora of Java
Flora of the Lesser Sunda Islands
Plants described in 1824